This is a list of communities known for possessing a large number of Stateside Puerto Ricans. Although, over 41 percent of Stateside Puerto Ricans live in just two states, namely New York and Florida, large numbers can also be found in the states of New Jersey, Pennsylvania, Massachusetts, and Connecticut. There are many states with smaller but fast-growing Puerto Rican populations including Rhode Island, Delaware, and Maryland in the Northeast, Virginia, North Carolina, Georgia, and Texas down south, Ohio, Illinois, and Wisconsin in the Midwest, and California and Hawaii out west.

Lists

Communities with the largest Puerto Rican populations
The top 25 US mainland communities with the highest populations of Puerto Ricans (Source: Census 2010)

 New York City, NY - 723,621
 Philadelphia, PA - 121,643
 Chicago, IL - 102,703
 Springfield, MA - 50,798
 Hartford, CT - 41,995
 Newark, NJ - 35,993
 Bridgeport, CT - 31,881
 Orlando, FL - 31,201
 Boston, MA - 30,506
 Allentown, PA - 29,640
 Cleveland, OH - 29,286
 Reading, PA - 28,160
 Rochester, NY - 27,734
 Kissimmee, FL - 27,257
 Waterbury, CT - 24,947
 Milwaukee, WI - 24,672
 Tampa, FL - 24,057
 Camden, NJ - 23,759
 Worcester, MA - 23,074
 Buffalo, NY - 22,076
 New Britain, CT - 21,914
 Jacksonville, FL - 21,128
 Paterson, NJ - 21,015
 New Haven, CT - 20,505
 Yonkers, NY - 19,875

Communities with highest percentages of Puerto Ricans
The top 25 US communities with the highest percentages of Puerto Ricans as a percent of total population (Source: Census 2010)

 Holyoke, MA - 44.70%
 Buenaventura Lakes, FL - 44.55%
 Azalea Park, FL - 36.50%
 Poinciana, FL - 35.82%
 Meadow Woods, FL - 35.11%
 Hartford, CT - 33.66%
 Springfield, MA - 33.19%
 Kissimmee, FL - 33.06%
 Reading, PA - 31.97%
 Camden, NJ - 30.72%
 New Britain, CT - 29.93%
 Lancaster, PA - 29.23%
 Vineland, NJ - 26.74%
 Union Park, FL - 25.81%
 Allentown, PA - 25.11%
 Windham, CT - 23.99%
 Lebanon, PA - 23.87%
 Perth Amboy, NJ - 23.79%
 Southbridge, MA - 23.08%
 Amsterdam, NY - 22.80%
 Harlem Heights, FL - 22.63%
 Waterbury, CT - 22.60%
 Lawrence, MA - 22.20%
 Dunkirk, NY - 22.14%
 Bridgeport, CT - 22.10%

Metropolitan areas with largest Puerto Rican populations
The largest populations of Puerto Ricans are situated in the following metropolitan areas (Source: Census 2010):

 New York-Northern New Jersey-Long Island, NY-NJ-PA-CT MSA - 1,177,430     (6.2% Puerto Rican)
 Orlando-Kissimmee-Sanford, FL MSA - 269,781     (12.6% Puerto Rican)
 Philadelphia-Camden-Wilmington, PA-NJ-DE-MD MSA - 239,866     (4.0% Puerto Rican)
 Miami-Fort Lauderdale-Pompano Beach, FL MSA - 207,727    (3.7% Puerto Rican)
 Chicago-Joliet-Naperville, IL-IN-WI MSA - 188,502     (2.0% Puerto Rican)
 Tampa-St. Petersburg-Clearwater, FL MSA - 143,886     (5.2% Puerto Rican)
 Boston-Cambridge-Quincy, MA-NH MSA - 115,087    (2.5% Puerto Rican)
 Hartford-East Hartford-Middletown, CT MSA - 102,911     (8.5% Puerto Rican)
 Springfield, MA MSA - 87,798     (12.7% Puerto Rican)
 New Haven-Milford, CT MSA - 77,578     (9.0% Puerto Rican)
 Allentown-Bethlehem-Easton, PA-NJ MSA - 60,412    (7.4% Puerto Rican)
 Cleveland-Elyria-Mentor, OH MSA - 59,123     (2.8% Puerto Rican)
 Los Angeles-Long Beach-Santa Ana, CA MSA - 55,699    (0.4% Puerto Rican)
 Providence-New Bedford-Fall River, RI-MA - 53,465      (3.3% Puerto Rican) 
 Bridgeport-Stamford-Norwalk, CT MSA - 50,511     (5.5% Puerto Rican)
 Washington-Arlington-Alexandria, DC-VA-MD-WV MSA - 48,168     (0.9% Puerto Rican)
 Worcester, MA MSA - 44,392     (5.6% Puerto Rican)
 Rochester, NY MSA - 44,383     (4.2% Puerto Rican)
 Atlanta-Sandy Springs-Marietta, GA MSA - 43,377     (0.8% Puerto Rican)
 Reading, PA MSA - 36,333 (8.8% Puerto Rican)
 Lakeland–Winter Haven, FL MSA - 34,825     (5.8% Puerto Rican)
 Dallas–Fort Worth–Arlington, TX MSA - 33,247     (0.5% Puerto Rican)
 Milwaukee-Waukesha-West Allis, WI MSA - 33,127     (2.1% Puerto Rican)
 Buffalo–Niagara Falls, NY MSA - 31,663     (2.8% Puerto Rican)
 Jacksonville, FL MSA - 30,532     (2.3% Puerto Rican)
 Lancaster, PA MSA - 30,403     (5.9% Puerto Rican)
 Houston-Sugar Land-Baytown, TX MSA - 29,840     (0.6% Puerto Rican)
 San Francisco–Oakland–Hayward, CA MSA - 28,093     (0.7% Puerto Rican)
 Deltona-Daytona Beach-Ormond Beach, FL MSA - 27,679     (5.6% Puerto Rican)
 Virginia Beach-Norfolk-Newport News, VA-NC MSA - 27,464     (1.6% Puerto Rican)
 Honolulu, HI MSA - 26,821     (2.9% Puerto Rican)
 Phoenix-Mesa-Scottsdale, AZ MSA - 23,423     (0.6% Puerto Rican)
 Baltimore-Towson, MD MSA - 23,164     (0.8% Puerto Rican)
 San Antonio-New Braunfels, TX MSA - 20,199 (1.0% Puerto Rican)
 Detroit-Warren-Livonia, MI MSA - 19,087     (0.4% Puerto Rican)
 Albany-Schenectady-Troy, NY MSA - 18,942     (2.2% Puerto Rican)
 Atlantic City, NJ MSA - 18,160     (6.6% Puerto Rican)
 Las Vegas-Paradise, NV MSA - 17,526     (0.9% Puerto Rican)
 Trenton-Princeton, NJ MSA - 17,097     (4.7% Puerto Rican)
 Charlotte-Gastonia-Rock Hill, NC-SC MSA - 16,147     (0.9% Puerto Rican)
 Ocala, FL MSA - 15,221     (4.6% Puerto Rican)
 Port St. Lucie, FL MSA - 14,125 (3.3% Puerto Rican)
 Harrisburg-Carlisle, PA MSA - 13,387     (2.4% Puerto Rican)
 York-Hanover, PA MSA - 13,493     (3.1% Puerto Rican)
 Fayetteville, NC MSA - 12,492 (3.4% Puerto Rican)
 Syracuse, NY MSA - 11,908     (1.8% Puerto Rican)
 Norwich-New London, CT MSA - 11,611     (4.2% Puerto Rican)
 Sarasota, FL MSA - 11,426     (1.6% Puerto Rican)
 Raleigh-Cary, NC MSA - 10,644     (0.9% Puerto Rican)
 Scranton-Wilkes Barre, PA MSA - 10,247     (1.8% Puerto Rican)
 Richmond, VA MSA - 10,074     (1.0% Puerto Rican)
 Columbus, OH MSA - 9,644     (0.7% Puerto Rican)
 Youngstown-Warren, OH-PA MSA - 9,215     (1.6% Puerto Rican)
 Dover, DE MSA - 9,199     (3.8% Puerto Rican)
 Pittsburgh, PA MSA - 9,023 (0.5% Puerto Rican)

Puerto Ricans around the country

The Northeast

The Northeastern United States is home to 2.5 million Puerto Ricans, comprising 53% of the Stateside Puerto Rican population nationwide. Lower New England and the NY-NJ-PA area hold the majority of the region's Puerto Rican population. Combined, the New England states are home to over 600,000 Puerto Ricans, with the vast majority in the Lower portion of New England, having a very high concentration of Puerto Ricans.

New York 
New York City has the largest population of Puerto Ricans in the country outside Puerto Rico itself, followed by Philadelphia. New York State has more Puerto Ricans than any other state, except for Florida. In New York, Puerto Rican populations are significant in New York City, Long Island, and the Hudson Valley, especially Yonkers and other areas throughout Westchester County, Binghamton, Newburgh, Middletown, Haverstraw, and the Albany-Schenectady-Troy area as well. There are also large Puerto Rican populations in the cities of Utica, Syracuse, Rochester, Buffalo, and Dunkirk in Western New York.

Pennsylvania 
In Pennsylvania, one-third of Puerto Ricans reside in Philadelphia. However, Puerto Ricans are more concentrated in South Central Pennsylvania and the Lehigh Valley. This area, extending from Harrisburg to the New Jersey border is home to almost half of Puerto Ricans statewide. Cities along this stretch include York, Harrisburg, Lancaster, Lebanon, Reading, Allentown, Bethlehem, and Easton. There is also a smaller Puerto Rican presence in towns such as Chester, Coatesville, Pottstown, and Norristown, as well as other areas in the Philadelphia Metro Area, especially Montgomery County and Delaware County. Though, the bulk of Pennsylvania's Puerto Rican population is in the southeastern section of the state, Hazleton, the Scranton-Wilkes Barre area, and the Poconos in northeastern Pennsylvania, as well as the Pittsburgh area, New Castle, and Erie in western Pennsylvania also have sizeable Puerto Rican populations present.

New Jersey 
In New Jersey, a slight majority of Puerto Ricans are located in North Jersey. Cities with significant populations include Newark, Jersey City, Paterson, Passaic, Perth Amboy, and Elizabeth. The remaining portion is in South Jersey, including cities like Trenton, Camden, Pennsauken, Vineland, Millville, Pleasantville, and Atlantic City.

Connecticut 
Connecticut has the highest concentration of Puerto Ricans of any state by percentage and has large Puerto Rican populations throughout the state, with the largest in Hartford, East Hartford, Bridgeport, New Haven, Meriden, Waterbury, New Britain, New London, Windham, Norwich, and Willimantic. Though, half of the Puerto Rican population in the New England area is situated along the Interstate-91 corridor, extending from New Haven in Connecticut to Holyoke in Massachusetts.

Massachusetts 
In Massachusetts, the largest Puerto Rican populations are in Holyoke, Springfield, Fitchburg, Lowell, Worcester, Lawrence, Lynn, Boston, Southbridge, Haverhill, Chicopee, Chelsea, Taunton, and New Bedford. The highest percentage of Puerto Ricans in the US proper can be found in Holyoke. Puerto Ricans continue to dominate demographically in the central and western parts of the state. Large portions of the state's Puerto Rican population is in the Boston area.

Rhode Island 
In Rhode Island, there is a large Puerto Rican population, vast majority of which live in Providence County, especially the cities of Providence, Cranston, Pawtucket, Central Falls, and Woonsocket.

The South

The Southern United States is home to 1.3 million Puerto Ricans, comprising 29% of the Puerto Rican population nationwide.

Florida 
Florida is home to two-thirds of the Puerto Rican population in the South. Florida is currently home to the fastest-growing Puerto Rican population of any state. Cubans and Puerto Ricans are Florida's largest Hispanic groups, though unlike the Cuban community which is nearly entirely located in the South Florida and Tampa Bay areas, the Puerto Rican population is far more spread-out and is present in large numbers in Central Florida, South Florida, and North Florida, having large populations in the metro areas of Orlando, Tampa, Miami, and Jacksonville, among other cities. South Florida has a large Puerto Rican population centered around the Miami metro area, yet are largely overlooked by Cuban dominance and the overall diversity of the Miami area, with large numbers in Miami, Hollywood, West Palm Beach, Homestead, North Miami, Boynton Beach, Coconut Creek, and Port St. Lucie. The west coast of Florida has significant Puerto Rican populations present in scattered areas, in cities such as, Tampa, St. Petersburg, Pinellas Park, Lakeland, Cape Coral, Lehigh Acres, and Fort Myers. Central Florida has the largest Puerto Rican population of any region in the state and the fastest-growing Puerto Rican population in the country. The Orlando metropolitan area is the center of the Puerto Rican population in Central Florida and there is large populations of Puerto Ricans throughout the region, with the largest populations in Orlando, Kissimmee, Poinciana, Buenaventura Lakes, Azalea Park, Meadow Woods, Pine Hills, Deltona, St. Cloud, Sanford, Apopka, Alafaya, Oak Ridge, Oviedo, Daytona Beach, and Palm Bay. Osceola County is the only county in the country where Puerto Ricans are the largest ancestral group. Puerto Ricans are also the vast majority of Hispanics in Volusia County. The I-4 corridor, extending from Daytona Beach to Tampa, is home to 500,000 Puerto Ricans. The I-4 corridor is politically considered the swing section of the state, yet Puerto Rican growth has created a Democratic registration advantage. Puerto Rican growth in Central Florida has also had a direct impact on the uninterrupted influence Cubans once had. In North Florida, there are significant Puerto Rican populations in Jacksonville, Orange Park, Ocala, Tallahassee, and Gainesville. Though, the most notable growth in North Florida has been in Clay County and the Jacksonville area. Though, the Puerto Rican population may not be as large as other parts of Florida, especially Central Florida, Puerto Ricans often make up the majority of Hispanics in many North Florida cities, due to lower percentages of Hispanics in North Florida.

Virginia 
In Virginia, over half of the Puerto Rican population is in the many independent cities of the Hampton Roads area, including Newport News, Hampton, Virginia Beach, Norfolk, Chesapeake, and Williamsburg. In fact, outside Florida, the region stretching from the Hampton Roads metropolitan area of Southeastern Virginia up to the Tri-cities portion of the Richmond metro area has the highest percentage of Puerto Ricans of any metropolitan area or urban region in the Southern United States. A large chunk of the remainder is mainly in the Richmond-Tri Cities area (especially south of the James River) and the DC suburbs of Northern Virginia.

North Carolina 
In North Carolina, there are significant and growing Puerto Rican populations in Fayetteville, and the metro areas of Raleigh/Durham and Charlotte.

Georgia 
In Georgia, over two-thirds of the state's Puerto Rican population is located in the Atlanta metropolitan area, with the remainder in other areas throughout the state, including the Jacksonville, FL-Savannah, GA region.

Delaware 
In Delaware, the majority of the Puerto Rican population lives in New Castle County, especially Wilmington and Elsmere among other cities, where there is a large Puerto Rican population, the area is often considered a part of the Philadelphia metropolitan area. Kent County also has a significant Puerto Rican population, especially in Dover.

Maryland 
In Maryland, the Puerto Rican population is much smaller compared to Lower New England and the NY-NJ-PA area. There is a small Puerto Rican population in Baltimore, as well as in many smaller cities throughout Central Maryland. About 85 percent of Maryland's Puerto Rican population lives in Central Maryland, split evenly between the Baltimore area and the Maryland portion of the DC area Though, Baltimore's Puerto Rican population is larger and more concentrated than that of Washington's. More Puerto Ricans in the Washington metro area live scattered among the surrounding suburbs, than the actual city itself.

Texas 
In Texas, the vast majority of the state's Puerto Rican population is present in the Texas Triangle mega-region, especially in and around the cities of Houston, San Antonio, Austin, Dallas, and Killeen.

The Midwest

The Midwestern United States is home to 435,000 Puerto Ricans, comprising 9% of the Puerto Rican population nationwide. A little less than two-thirds of the population can be found in three Metropolitan Statistical Areas: Chicago, Cleveland, and Milwaukee. Only in Cleveland are Puerto Ricans the largest Hispanic group.

Illinois 
In Illinois, 56% of the Puerto Rican population is located in the city of Chicago, with the remaining portion of the state's Puerto Rican population concentrated in Chicago's suburbs, including Waukegan, Aurora, Cicero, and Elgin. The Humboldt Park neighborhood is home to the largest concentration of Puerto Ricans in the Midwest.

Ohio 
In Ohio, roughly two-thirds of Puerto Ricans can be found in the Greater Cleveland area. Cleveland has the largest population of Puerto Ricans in the state. There are many other Ohio cities with significant Puerto Rican populations, particularly in Northeast Ohio, where the vast majority of the state's Puerto Rican population lives, including places like Lorain, Elyria, Youngstown, Campbell, Akron, Ashtabula, and Newburgh Heights. The Columbus area also has a significant and growing Puerto Rican population. Northeast Ohio has the highest concentration of Puerto Ricans in the Midwest and any state outside the eastcoast, with Lorain having the highest Puerto Rican percentage outside the eastcoast. In recent years, Ohio has replaced Illinois as the most popular Midwest destination for Puerto Ricans, with many more choosing the Cleveland and Columbus areas of Ohio over the Chicago area.

Wisconsin 
In Wisconsin, 53% of the Puerto Rican population resides in the city of Milwaukee, the remaining portion is mostly in southeastern Wisconsin, in areas near Milwaukee and Chicago.

Indiana 
Elsewhere in the Midwest, in Indiana, Northwest Indiana has many Puerto Ricans in cities such as Hammond and East Chicago. The city of Indianapolis also has a small population. The majority of Indiana's Puerto Rican population is in Northwest Indiana, with most of the remaining portion in the Indianapolis area.

Michigan 
In Michigan, the Puerto Rican population is relatively small, yet present in Detroit and Pontiac.

The West

The Western United States is home to 372,000 Puerto Ricans, comprising 8% of the Puerto Rican population nationwide.

California 
In California, Puerto Rican populations are largely present in Los Angeles, Long Beach, San Diego, and many other cities in Southern California and the Inland Empire region, as well as the Bay Area, especially San Francisco.

Nevada, Arizona & Honolulu 
There are also small Puerto Rican populations present in Las Vegas, Nevada and Phoenix, Arizona, as well as the Honolulu metropolitan area in Hawaii.

New Mexico
There is a Puerto Rican community in Albuquerque and Rio Rancho, but less than one percent of the metro area’s population; there is a Puerto Rican festival held starting in October 2022.

See also

 Puerto Rican migration to New York City
 Nuyorican
 Puerto Ricans in Chicago
 History of the Puerto Ricans in Philadelphia
 Puerto Ricans in Holyoke
 Puerto Rican migration to Hawaii
 Puerto Ricans in the Virgin Islands
 Puerto Ricans in the United States
 Puerto Rican people

Puerto Rican culture in the United States